The Cabinet Secretary for Justice and Veterans, commonly referred to as the Justice Secretary, is a position in the Scottish Government Cabinet. The Cabinet Secretary has overall responsibility for law and order in Scotland. The Cabinet Secretary is assisted by the Minister for Community Safety.

The current Cabinet Secretary for Justice is Keith Brown, who was appointed in May 2021.

History

The position was created in 1999 as the Minister for Justice, with the advent of devolution and the institution of the Scottish Parliament, taking over some of the roles and functions of the former Scottish Office Minister of State for Home Affairs that existed prior to 1999.

As with the UK Secretary of State for Justice, but unlike some other justice ministers, the Cabinet Secretary does not have any oversight of prosecutions - in Scotland these are handled by the Lord Advocate.

Overview

Responsibilities
The responsibilities of the Cabinet Secretary for Justice include:
Policing
Fire and rescue services
Courts & sentencing
The justice system and criminal law procedure
Violence reduction
Prison reform and prisoner policy
Reducing reoffending
Security
Youth justice
Access to justice
Civil law
Victim/witness support
Criminal injuries compensation
Legal aid fund
Scottish Courts and Tribunals Service
Bairn's Hoose
Justice reform
National Community Justice Strategy
Veterans

Public bodies

The following public bodies report to the Cabinet Secretary for Justice:
 Disclosure Scotland
 Judicial Appointments Board for Scotland
 Judicial Complaints Reviewer
 Parole Board for Scotland
 Police Investigations and Review Commissioner
 Risk Management Authority
 Scottish Courts and Tribunals Service
 Scottish Criminal Cases Review Commission
 Scottish Fire and Rescue Service
 Scottish Law Commission
 Scottish Legal Aid Board
 Scottish Legal Complaints Commission
 Scottish Police Authority
 Scottish Prison Service

Salary

List of office holders

See also
Politics of Scotland
Scottish Government
Scottish Parliament

References

Justice
 
Scots law formal titles